This is a list of notable theatres in the German state of Bavaria, organized by administrative district.

Altbayern

Upper Palatinate 
 Stadttheater Amberg
 Theater Regensburg
 Velodrom

Upper Bavaria 

 Altes Stadttheater Eichstätt
 Schlierseer Bauerntheater
 Stadttheater Ingolstadt

Lower Bavaria 
 Kleines theater – Kammerspiele Landshut
 Landestheater Niederbayern
 Stadttheater Passau
 Theater an der Rott

Franconia

Upper Franconia 
 Bamberger Marionettentheater
 E.T.A.-Hoffmann-Theater
 Landestheater Coburg
 Theater am Michelsberg
 Theater der Schatten
 Theater Hof

Middle Franconia 
 Comödie Fürth
 Dehnberger Hoftheater
 Freilandtheater Bad Windsheim
 Markgrafentheater Erlangen
 Staatstheater Nurnberg
 Stadttheater Fürth
 Theater Ansbach

Lower Franconia 
 Fränkisches Theater Schloss Maßbach
 Kurtheater Bad Kissingen
 Mainfranken Theater Würzburg

Swabia 
 Freilichtspiele Altusried
 Historisches Stadttheater Weißenhorn
 Musiktheater Füssen
 Staatstheater Augsburg
 Stadttheater Kempten
 Stadttheater Lindau
 Theater Neu-Ulm

 
Bavaria
Theatre